Juicy Couture is an American casualwear and dress clothing brand based in Arleta, Los Angeles, California. Best known for their iconic velour tracksuits which became a luxury staple in the 2000s, the company was founded by Pamela Skaist-Levy and Gela Nash-Taylor in 1997 and was later purchased by the Liz Claiborne fashion company  in 2003. Juicy Couture has turned into a global seller with their signature velour tracksuits and other fashions that span  clothing, denim, handbags, shoes, intimates, swimwear, fragrance, accessories, sunglasses, yoga and babywear.

History
Juicy Couture was started by two friends in 1997. Gela Nash (before marrying Duran Duran's John Taylor) and Pamela Skaist-Levy, both residing in Pacoima, California, decided to create their own fashion label, Travis Jeans, in 1989 selling maternity pants. In 1996 they changed the name to Juicy Couture.

All Juicy Couture items are manufactured with the company signature logo: two highland terriers holding a shield bearing three hearts and Love P&G (for Pamela and Gela). A crown lies on top along with a Juicy Couture flowing banner.

From 1996, after establishing their company and needing to get public attention for the brand, Nash and Levy started to send their completed designs to celebrities. In 2001, the famous Juicy tracksuit was introduced and custom designed for Madonna; and Madonna turned the velour tracksuit into a trend. The public appearance of clothes worn by celebrities made the brand famous almost instantly. Madonna was the first big breakthrough celebrity endorsement for the company. Later, in 2004, the velour tracksuit once again became very popular among celebrities such as Jennifer Lopez, Britney Spears, and Paris Hilton. Juicy Couture then became a brand known around the world for the image of being the outfit of the "new money". Juicy Couture was a limited brand being available at few locations until the late 2000s.

In 2003 Fifth & Pacific Companies, Inc. (formerly Liz Claiborne Inc.) acquired the company.

On November 1, 2010, LeAnn Nealz was named president and chief creative officer. In this position, she would be responsible for all creative elements of the business including product design of the items, marketing and store design and reporting to Edgar Huber, chief executive officer of Juicy Couture. Former Vogue accessories director Michelle Sanders was also hired to handle new licenses for jewelry, handbags and swimwear.

An informed "guesstimate" put Juicy sales at about $200 million in one year. Vogue noted the company's growing – even exploding – popularity, saying, "The time may have come when Seventh Avenue's lofty vantage point suddenly seems less relevant than the ground-level perspective of the designer as consumer."

Sale
On October 7, 2013, Fifth & Pacific, Inc. announced that they would sell Juicy Couture to Authentic Brands Group for $195 million. In June 2014, the company was reported to be closing all its stores in the United States, with the closure expected by the end of June 2015. The company's 60 international stores would remain operating. In September 2014, Juicy Couture began being sold in Kohl's in the United States. In 2021, JCPenney began selling Juicy by Juicy Couture.

References

External links

 
 

1990s fashion
2000s fashion
2010s fashion
1997 establishments in California
Arleta, Los Angeles
Clothing brands of the United States
Clothing companies established in 1997
Clothing companies based in Los Angeles
Eyewear brands of the United States
2003 mergers and acquisitions
2013 mergers and acquisitions
Authentic Brands Group